The small scaled nothobranch (Nothobranchius microlepis)  is a species of killifish in the family Nothobranchiidae. It is [occurs in northeastern Africa on Kenya, Somalia and Ethiopia. Its natural habitat is intermittent freshwater wetlands.

References 

Fish described in 1897
Small-scaled nothobranch
Endemic freshwater fish of Kenya
Taxonomy articles created by Polbot